The 1947–48 Boston College Eagles men's ice hockey season was the 26th season of play for the program but first under the oversight of the NCAA. The Eagles represent Boston College and were coached by John "Snooks" Kelley, in his 12th season.

Season
With the NCAA instituting a college hockey tournament for the first time, BC had high hopes of being one of the two eastern teams invited to participate. Unfortunately, the Eagles had to contend with the absence of several key players early in the season. Star center Warren Lewis came down with an illness before the first game was played and was out of the lineup for their opening game against cross-town rival Harvard. His scoring touch was missed as BC fell to the Crimson 3–4. After two less-than-comfortable wins over Fort Devens State and MIT, the team lost their top two defensemen when Butch Songin and John Gallagher were injured in a car accident just before Christmas. However, by that time Warren Lewis had recovered and was back in the lineup. Filling in for the missing players were new additions Frank Shellenback and Ed Clasby but they could not make up for the missing defensive prowess.

Over the succeeding five weeks, BC posted a mediocre 3–3 record and surrendered an average of 5 goals per game. It was only though the exploits of Mason, Lewis and Corcoran that allowed BC to remain in contention for the national tournament. Their biggest game during that stretch was against perennial powerhouse Dartmouth when they handed the Indians their first loss of the season. Songin returned just in time for the match against the green and was vital in keeping the high-powered Indians away from Bernie Burke and the BC cage. The reprieve was short-lived, however, as Songin missed several of the following games. 

The three-game losing skid had BC in a precarious position, however, Ed Songin returned healthy in time for the game against New Hampshire, rejoining the team along with Gallagher. The result was an overwhelming victory over the Wildcats which began a streak of dominating play that would last until the end of the regular season. After slicing through the Georgetown Hoyas, BC shutout Fort Devens State in the rematch with both Burke and backup Norm Dailey getting a turn in the crease.

BC ended the regular season with revenge wins over Harvard and Boston University in overwhelming fashion. In doing so they finished second in the NEIHL and appeared in the conference's first postseason tournament. They met Bowdoin in the Semifinal and eviscerated the Polar Bears 10–1 with a total team effort. In the championship game BC faced off against Northeastern, who had upset the top-seeded Terriers. The Eagles relied heavily on Burke to keep them in the game and their BC netminder faced a withering array of shots. He was up to the task and BC entered the third down just a goal. After the Huskies increased their lead to 2, BC rallied to score four consecutive goals in just over 6 minutes of game time to capture the championship.

The title, along with their stellar overall record, enabled BC to earn the second eastern bid for the inaugural NCAA tournament. They travelled to Colorado Springs and faced a powerful Michigan squad. The two teams proved to be the equal of one another as BC got three separate 1-goal leads only to see Michigan tie the score each time. The Wolverines earned their first lead of the match in the third period and jealously held on to the advantage as time ticked away. With under a minute to play, and Burke sitting on the bench in favor of a sixth skater, Jim Fitzgerald tied the game and sent the match into overtime. The NCAA rules at the time followed the original college hockey format that allowed for all 20 minutes of an overtime period to be played regardless of how many goals were scored. This meant that when Wally Gacek scored just 18 seconds into the extra period, BC still had a chance to win the game. Unfortunately, the Wolverines played a stingy defensive game for the rest of the contest and the Eagles were unable to tie the game. Instead, Gacek added a second marker with 30 seconds left in the 4th period, leaving the final score 4–6 in favor of Michigan. Because the NCAA changed the rules afterwards to mirror the more modern sudden-death rules, this was the only game in NCAA history where more than one overtime goal was scored.

Roster

Note: Boston College did not use numbers on their jerseys at this time.Note: Clasby, Dowd, Falvey and Shellenback are listed as being members of the team for at least part of the season, however, it's unclear whether any of the four played in any games.

Standings

Schedule and results

|-
!colspan=12 style=";" | Regular Season

|-
!colspan=12 style=";" | NEIHL Tournament

|-
!colspan=12 style=";" | 

Note: The NCAA had not yet instituted sudden death overtime, allowing more than one goal to be scored during the full extra period.

Scoring statistics

Note: 3 goals are unaccounted for. Additionally, the assist total is likely incomplete.

Goaltending statistics

Note: Burke and Dailey shared the shutout on February 23.

Awards and honors

References

External links 

1947-48
Boston College
Boston College
Boston College Eagles men's ice hockey season
Boston College Eagles men's ice hockey season
1940s in Boston